This is a list of heads of the Una-Sana Canton.

Heads of the Una-Sana Canton (1995–present)

Governors

Prime Ministers

Notes

External links
World Statesmen - Una-Sana Canton

Una-Sana Canton